Coram  is a hamlet and census-designated place in the town of Brookhaven, Suffolk County, Long Island, New York,  United States. As of the 2010 United States census, the CDP population was 39,113.

History 

Coram is the oldest settlement in the central part of the town of Brookhaven. Its early name was "Wincoram", perhaps the name of a Native American who lived in the area as late as 1703. The first European settler in the area was likely William Satterly, who sought permission to open a tavern to cater to travelers in 1677.

During the American Revolutionary War, Benjamin Tallmadge with his contingent of Light Dragoons arrived and he with 12 Culper Ring men captured and burned 300 tons of hay the British were storing for winter to feed their horses.   George Washington, on hearing the news, sent the following letter to Tallmadge:
I have received with much pleasure the report of your successful enterprise upon fort St. George, and was pleased with the destruction of the hay at Coram, which must be severely felt by the enemy at this time. I beg you to accept my thanks for your spirited execution of this business. Annually Coram celebrates the event in October.

From 1784 to 1885, Coram served as the meeting place for the Town of Brookhaven government, using the Davis Town Meeting House for much of that period. The Davis House, built in the 1750s, was placed on the National Register of Historic Places in 2001 and is the oldest existing structure in Coram.

A small airport existed in Coram until 1984.

Geography

Demographics for the CDP

As of the 2000 census, 34,923 people, 12,530 households, and 9,121 families resided in the CDP. The population density was 2,532.1 per square mile (977.8/km2). There were 12,880 housing units at an average density of 933.9/sq mi (360.6/km2). The racial makeup of the CDP was 89.5% White, 1.7% African American, 0.3% Native American, 3.1% Asian, 0.0% Pacific Islander, 3.1% from other races, and 2.3% from two or more races. Hispanic or Latino of any race were 9.5% of the population.

There were 12,530 households, out of which 35.3% had children under the age of 18 living with them, 57.9% were married couples living together, 11.4% had a female householder with no husband present, and 27.2% were non-families. 21.3% of all households were made up of individuals, and 6.1% had someone living alone who was 65 years of age or older. The average household size was 2.75 and the average family size was 3.22.

In the CDP, the population was spread out, with 25.1% under the age of 18, 7.9% from 18 to 24, 33.5% from 25 to 44, 24.1% from 45 to 64, and 9.3% who were 65 years of age or older. The median age was 35 years. For every 100 females, there were 93.1 males. For every 100 females age 18 and over, there were 89.2 males.

The median income for a household in the CDP was $61,309, and the median income for a family was $70,769. Males had a median income of $46,905 versus $34,545 for females. The per capita income for the CDP was $24,597. About 4.1% of families and 5.6% of the population were below the poverty threshold, including 5.5% of those under age 18 and 7.2% of those age 65 or over.

Education
 Longwood Central School District
 Middle Country Central School District

Notable people
Bridget Dowling, sister-in-law of Adolf Hitler and resident of Coram at the end of her life.
George J. Hochbrueckner, former congressman and resident of Coram while he was in office.

See also
Holy Sepulchre Cemetery

References

External links

 Coram's page at the Longwood School District website

Brookhaven, New York
Hamlets in New York (state)
Census-designated places in New York (state)
Census-designated places in Suffolk County, New York
Hamlets in Suffolk County, New York